Commanders: Attack of the Genos (known as simply Commanders: Attack!) is a turn-based strategy Xbox Live Arcade game developed by Southend Interactive and published by Vivendi Games for the Xbox 360, featuring strategic troop placement and head-to-head warfare, using such weaponry as missile launchers, bombers and infantry. The game has high-definition graphics featuring a 1930s art deco style look and feel, inspired by The War of the Worlds.

The single player campaign consists of 15 missions, as well as online and same machine multiplayer play of up to 4 players, with skirmishes and co-op play.

Plot

Commanders: Attack of the Genos tells the story of an alternate history, one in which humanity has discovered the secrets of atomic energy right at the opening of the 20th Century. By the year 1924, technology as accelerated to the point where humans have cracked the human genome, and have managed to create a whole new race of genetically modified lifeforms, dubbed Genos. Genos have been developed to be stronger, faster, and generally better on the whole than the rest of the human race, causing the rest of the world to resent the Genos. This results in their eventual exile to another land. While a tenuous peace existed between the two races for some time, the start of the game seems to indicate that the time for peace has passed, as the Genos invade.

Reception

The game received above-average reviews according to the review aggregation website Metacritic.

References

External links
 

2008 video games
Computer wargames
Multiplayer and single-player video games
Sierra Entertainment games
Southend Interactive games
Turn-based tactics video games
Video games developed in Sweden
Xbox 360 games
Xbox 360 Live Arcade games
Xbox 360-only games